John Arthur Stokes (born 31 December 1931) is an American educator who was a prominent figure in the civil rights movement.

Born in Kingsville, Virginia, Stokes grew up in the Jim Crow South and attended Robert Russa Moton High School, a segregated school for black students. Recognizing the inequalities he and his classmates faced, Stokes staged a walk out and refused to return to class until the school was rebuilt.  He attended Virginia State University and became an educator in Baltimore.

Awards 
J A Stokes received following awards.

References

Civil rights movement
African-American educators
American educators
American civil rights activists
1931 births
Living people
21st-century African-American people
20th-century African-American people